Cleman Mountain is a ridge in Yakima County, Washington, in the United States.

Cleman Mountain was named for John Cleman, a local pioneer in the Wenas Valley.

References

Ridges of Yakima County, Washington
Ridges of Washington (state)